Pandirodesmus is a genus of flat-backed millipedes in the family Chelodesmidae, occurring in Trinidad and Tobago and Guyana. They are characterized by a lightly sclerotized, smooth, greyish-white exoskeleton
and alternating long and short legs, exposed parts usually covered with densely cemented, but loosely attached sand grains imparting a dark beige to black coloration and concealing setae.

References 

Fauna of Trinidad and Tobago
Polydesmida
Millipede genera